Asiab (also Romanized as Āsīāb) is a village in Abnama Rural District, in the Central District of Rudan County, Hormozgan Province, Iran. At the 2006 census, its population was 450, in 89 families.

References 

Populated places in Rudan County